The 1933–34 NWHL season was the first season of the North West Hockey League, a minor professional ice hockey league in the Northwestern United States and Canada. Five teams participated in the league, and the Calgary Tigers won the championship.

Regular season

Playoffs

Semi-final
Best of 3

Vancouver Lions beat Edmonton Eskimos 2 wins to none.

Final
Best of 5

Calgary Tigers beat Vancouver Lions 3 wins to 2.

External links
Season on hockeydb.com

1933 in ice hockey
1934 in ice hockey